Jiegao is a border trade zone in southern China near the border with Myanmar.

Geography 

Jiegao is located on the east bank of the Shweli River, surrounded by Burmese land.

History 
Jiegao was founded as a provincial-level border trade zone in 1991, and updated to a national-level border trade zone in 2000. The trade zone implements a special mode called "out of customs but in the border", which means the customs station is located at the west end of bridge, but the Jiegao is located at the east. Exporting goods that cross the customs station to Jiegao is an export, and imported goods are exempt from declaration to the customs in the Jiegao trade zone.

Transport 

Jiegao is the end of China National Highway 320.

References 

Dehong Dai and Jingpo Autonomous Prefecture